Primetime Glick is an American television series starring Martin Short as Jiminy Glick. The series aired on Comedy Central from June 20, 2001 to July 3, 2003.

Format
The half-hour show is a spoof of late night talk shows such as The Tonight Show, with bandleader Adrian Van Voorhees (Michael McKean), and sometimes exposing fake production staff. Host Jiminy Glick (Martin Short in a fat suit) has a monologue and banter with Van Voorhees, and then centers the show on a series of interviews where "guest celebrities try to hold up their end of the hilariously incoherent conversation". Interspersed between those are advertisements for absurd products and shows.

Reception
Terry Kelleher of People.com liked the show overall, but said the mock advertisements "tend to be funnier in concept (Short as Tom Green delivering a pizza to terrorist Osama bin Laden) than in execution" and would prefer more interaction with Van Voorhees. Michael Abernethy of Popmatters approved, saying that, compared to Short's previous manic characters, Glick's character format allows for more focus on the dynamic dialogue exchanges between host and guests, who are having genuine fun like a "giggle fit". He complained that the short half hour format limits some "clever concepts that could become models of comic timing if allowed to ease to a climax".

Series overview

Episodes

Season 1 (2001)

Season 2 (2002)

Season 3 (2003)

References

External links 
 

2001 American television series debuts
2003 American television series endings
2000s American parody television series
Comedy Central original programming